Albert Bonzano (2 March 1905 – 13 August 1985) was a French rower. He competed at the 1924 Summer Olympics (Men's Coxless Fours, 4 place) and the 1928 Summer Olympics. Brother of Henri Bonzano.

References

External links
 

1905 births
1985 deaths
French male rowers
Olympic rowers of France
Rowers at the 1924 Summer Olympics
Rowers at the 1928 Summer Olympics
Rowers from Paris